Cristo Reyes Torres (born 30 July 1987) is a Spanish darts player who plays in Professional Darts Corporation (PDC) events.

Career

In October 2014, Reyes bested a field of 154 players to win the Iberian Qualifier for the 2015 PDC World Championship, sealing his place in the draw by whitewashing Jose Rodriguez 6–0 in the final. He entered the event in the preliminary round and comfortably beat Christian Perez 4–0. Reyes then took the first two sets against Wes Newton, before the world number 13 responded to level the tie. Both players broke each other's throw in the deciding set, with the match going in to a sudden death leg. Reyes' first dart hit the outer bull as in a sudden death leg both players throw a dart at the bull to decide who throws first. However, the referee did not realise this and Reyes was made to continue the leg until the refereeing team stepped in to restart it after both players had thrown six darts. Reyes again hit the outer bull to throw first and won the match by hitting double 16 at the first time of asking to complete a huge shock. Newton branded the refereeing a joke but praised Reyes for having better composure in the same situation.

Reyes made history in the next round as he became the first Spanish player to make it to the third round of the PDC World Championship. He fought back from 3–1 down against Kevin Painter to beat him 4–3, winning the final set without reply. Reyes averaged 115 in taking the first set of his third round match with Gary Anderson, before Anderson responded with four straight sets to end Reyes' tournament. Reyes missed three darts to extend the game into a sixth set, with Anderson's final average of 104.54 being the second highest of the tournament. Former world number one Rod Harrington suggested Reyes' performances in the event would result in the emergence of more Iberian darts players in the future.

As a result of his World Championship performance and the non-renewal of Tour Cards by Richie Burnett and Jarkko Komula, Reyes picked up a PDC Tour Card for the first time in January 2015. He threw a nine-dart finish in the last 16 of the second Players Championship event, but would go on to lose the match 6–2 against Robert Thornton. Reyes was now the number one Spanish player on the Order of Merit and he teamed up with Antonio Alcinas at the World Cup of Darts. In Reyes' debut in the event they whitewashed Norway 5–0 in the opening round but lost their single matches to the Belgium brothers Kim and Ronny Huybrechts in the second round. In his first European Championship, Reyes averaged 100.69 in defeating Max Hopp 6–2, but was then heavily beaten 10–3 by Michael van Gerwen.
He was consistent on the Pro Tour during the year with a number of last 16 finishes amassing him £18,000 on the Order of Merit. This saw him qualify for the 2016 World Championship and a first round rematch from last year with Wes Newton. Reyes relinquished the first set  from two legs to none up (missing seven set darts in total) despite Newton averaging just 67.31 and went on to lose 3–1.

Reyes was beaten 6–4 by Andrew Davidson in the second round of the 2016 UK Open. At the fifth Players Championship event he reached the quarter-finals of a Pro Tour event for the first time and was edged out 6–5 by Robbie Green. A 6–2 win over Mensur Suljović saw him advance to the semi-finals of the 11th event, where he lost 6–4 to Joe Cullen. A win would have seen Reyes qualify for the World Matchplay. Two further quarter-finals did see him qualify for the World Grand Prix for the first time and his first round match went to a deciding leg, which Kyle Anderson won. A 6–4 win over Robert Thornton saw Reyes reach the second round of the European Championship for the second year in a row and he lost 10–7 to Peter Wright. Reyes closed out the major events of 2016 with a 6–5 loss to Berry van Peer in the opening round of the Players Championship Finals.

Reyes had a checkout percentage of 60 as he edged out Dimitri Van den Bergh 3–2 at the 2017 World Championship and faced Michael van Gerwen in round two. He missed one dart against Van Gerwen to square the match at 3–3 and lost 4–2 despite averaging a superior 106.07. This set a new record for the highest losing average at the World Championships for a few days until Raymond van Barneveld was eliminated by Van Gerwen in the semi-finals with him averaging 109.34. Reyes and Antonio Alcinas were whitewashed 4–0 in the deciding doubles match in the second round of the World Cup to the Singapore team of Paul Lim and Harith Lim.

World Championship results

PDC

 2015: Third round (lost to Gary Anderson 1–4)
 2016: First round (lost to Wes Newton 1–3)
 2017: Second round (lost to Michael van Gerwen 2–4)
 2018: First round (lost to Toni Alcinas 1–3)
 2019: Third round (lost to Rob Cross 0–4)
 2020: Second round (lost to Adrian Lewis 2–3)

Performance timeline

References

External links

1987 births
Living people
Spanish darts players
People from San Cristóbal de La Laguna
Sportspeople from the Province of Santa Cruz de Tenerife
PDC World Cup of Darts Spanish team
Professional Darts Corporation former tour card holders